Charles Hatcher may refer to:
 Charles Ray Hatcher, American serial killer
 Charles Floyd Hatcher, American politician and lawyer
 Edwin Starr, born Charles Edwin Hatcher - American singer